CEACAM19 is a gene which encodes carcinoembryonic antigen.